Iran has several private and public airline companies in operation. The oldest is the Iranian Airways Company, founded in 1944 (known as Iran Air since 1961).

As of June 2009, Iranian planes fly 45 international flight routes. Most of the fleet of Iranian airlines today consist of old Boeings and used or leased Airbus and regional jets like British Aerospace 146 and ATR 72 and Fokker 100. Sanctions from the United States prevents Iran from purchasing most new western made aircraft to update its rapidly aging fleet. Iran's own poor safety regulations and mismanagement on behalf of the Iran civil aviation authorities has also been a known factor to blame. This has resulted in a series of ongoing disasters and incidents. Because of this, in the last 25 years there have been 17 plane crashes, and 1500 deaths (From 2000 to 2006, 11 Iranian plane crashes claimed about 700 lives). 

Iran has initiated manufacturing aircraft on its own such as the IR.AN-140. A number of 108 airliners have been added to the fleet of Iranian passenger planes during the last five years. As at July 2015, Iran had 251 commercial planes with 41,218 seats and 6 cargo planes, many (around 100) of which are not functional because of a lack of spare parts. In 2021, Iranian media reported than 50% of Iran’s fleet is grounded because of lack of spare parts and other technical problems.

In 2016, at the risk of seriously undermining or destroying its own naissant domestic aviation industry, Iran announced its intention to buy over 200 heavy airplanes from Boeing and Airbus at a cost of more than $50 billion - which exceeds the entire fleet of Air France who operates in a country that has seven times the number of air travelers as Iran. This, in addition to more planned orders of 100 medium-range planes to Japan's Mitsubishi, Brazil's Embraer and Canada's Bombardier. Iran says these deals include authorization to maintain these planes inside of Iran, including the production of parts and training.

Iran plans to buy 400 passenger planes by 2025 worth some $20 billion, if US sanctions are lifted.

Commercial airlines

Cargo airlines

See also
List of airlines
List of defunct airlines of Iran
List of defunct airlines of Asia
Tourism in Iran
List of airports in Iran
Iran Aviation Industries Organization
International Rankings of Iran in Transportation
Iran airshow
Iran Civil Aviation Organization
List of Iranian Aviation Accidents and Incidents
Transport in Iran

References

External links

Civil Aviation Organization of Iran
Iran Airlines Fleet List

Iran
Airlines
Airlines
Iran